Philosophische (German: philosophical) may refer to:

Philosophy
Philosophische Studien (Philosophical Studies), an academic journal
Philosophical Investigations (Philosophische Untersuchungen), 1953 work by Ludwig Wittgenstein
Philosophical Inquiries into the Essence of Human Freedom (Philosophische Untersuchungen über das Wesen der menschlichen Freiheit), 1809 work by Friedrich Schelling

See also
Philosophy (disambiguation)